Lila Grace Rose (born July 27, 1988) is an American anti-abortion activist who is the founder and president of the anti-abortion organization Live Action. She has conducted undercover, investigative exposés of abortion facilities in the United States, including affiliates of Planned Parenthood Federation of America.

Early life and education
Rose was raised in San Jose, California, the third of eight children. She was home-schooled through the end of high school and majored in history at the University of California, Los Angeles (UCLA). She was raised as Evangelical Protestant and later converted to Catholicism.

Activism 
In 2003, at the age of 15, Rose founded the anti-abortion group Live Action and began giving presentations to schools and youth groups.  While at UCLA, she partnered with conservative activist James O'Keefe to conduct undercover videos of abortion providers.

Rose has concentrated her activism on Planned Parenthood and National Abortion Federation affiliates in the United States, focusing on the anti-abortion interpretation of the moral and ethical aspects of abortion and financial issues in the abortion industry. She has also highlighted the high abortion rate in the African-American community.

In 2006, Rose, as a college freshman, conducted her first undercover video investigation on abortion at UCLA's Arthur Ashe Student Health and Wellness Center. Her freshman year she also founded the pro-life student magazine The Advocate.

In 2007, Rose visited two Planned Parenthood facilities in Los Angeles and recorded undercover videos while purporting to be a 15-year-old girl who had been impregnated by a 23-year-old male who was accompanying her, telling staffers she did not want her parents to find out about the relationship. No employee at either clinic objected to the situation, and a receptionist at one facility "told Rose to say she was 16, because if she was 15, the clinic would have to make a report to the police." Rose has posed as an abortion-seeking teen impregnated by an older man in additional stings at Planned Parenthood clinics in Indianapolis, Bloomington, Tucson, Phoenix and Memphis. According to Politico, "Within the anti-abortion community, Rose has been widely lauded for her undercover investigations into abortion clinics."

Rose was featured in an Atlantic October 2018 original short documentary, "Meet the Face of the Millennial Anti-Abortion Movement."

In July 2019, Rose addressed the White House "social media summit" alongside President Donald Trump.

Recognition and awards
 2008: "Person of the Year Malachi Award" from Operation Rescue
 2008: Awarded $50,000 in the annual "Life Prizes" awards of the Gerard Health Foundation
 2010: "Young Leader Award" from the Susan B. Anthony List
 2013: Named to the National Journals list, "The 25 Most Influential Washington Women Under 35"
 2014: Named to Christianity Todays "33 under 33"

Personal life
Rose is married and has a son.

Publications
Fighting for Life: Becoming a Force for Change in a Wounded World (2021)

References

External links

 Profile at Live Action
 
 

1988 births
Living people
21st-century Roman Catholics
Activists from California
American child activists
American anti-abortion activists
American community activists
Converts to Roman Catholicism from Evangelicalism
Internet activists
People from San Jose, California
University of California, Los Angeles alumni
Catholics from California